The Parroquia del Espíritu Santo y San Patricio, constructed in 1645, is one of Puerto Rico's oldest Catholic parish churches. It is located in the main plaza of the municipality of Loíza, Puerto Rico. The church represents an ethnically distinct community characterized by a rich Afro-Hispanic cultural and folk craft tradition.  The structure's massive walls and buttresses helped the building withstand flood and hurricanes and likewise provided the people of Loíza with shelter from such natural disasters. The church, named after Saint Patrick, was enlarged to its present size in 1729.

The church was listed on the U.S. National Register of Historic Places in 1976.

See also

National Register of Historic Places listings in eastern Puerto Rico

Notes

References

Churches on the National Register of Historic Places in Puerto Rico
Churches completed in 1729
Roman Catholic churches in Puerto Rico
Spanish Colonial architecture in Puerto Rico
Loíza, Puerto Rico
1729 establishments in New Spain